The 2015–16 season was Gorica's 25th season in the Slovenian PrvaLiga, the Slovenian top division, since the league was created in 1991 with Gorica as one of the league's founding members. Gorica competed in the PrvaLiga and Cup. The season for the club began on 18 July 2015 and ended on 21 May 2016.

Players
As of 1 March 2016

Source:ND Gorica

Competitions

Overall

Overview

PrvaLiga

League table

Results summary

Results by round

Matches

Cup

First round

Statistics

Squad statistics

Goalscorers

See also
2015–16 Slovenian PrvaLiga
2015–16 Slovenian Football Cup

References

External links
Official website 
Facebook profile
PrvaLiga profile 
Official UEFA profile
Soccerway profile

Slovenian football clubs 2015–16 season